 

Abdera was an ancient Carthaginian and Roman port on a hill above the modern Adra on the southeastern Mediterranean coast of Spain. It was located between Malaca (now Málaga) and Carthago Nova (now Cartagena) in the district inhabited by the Bastuli.

Name
Abdera shares its name with a city in Thrace and another in North Africa. Its coins bore the inscription . The first element in the name appears to be the Punic word for "servant" or "slave"; the second element seems shared by the Phoenician names for Gadir (now Cadiz) and Cythera but of unclear meaning.

It appears in Greek sources as tà Ábdēra and Aúdēra, Ábdara, and tò Ábdēron.

History
Abdera was founded in the 8th century BCE as a Phoenician colony. It became a Carthaginian trading station and, after a period of decline, became one of the more important towns in the Roman province of Hispania Baetica. Tiberius seems to have made the place a Roman colony.

Coins
The most ancient coins bear its name with the head of Melqart and a tuna. Coins from the time of Tiberius show the town's main temple with two erect tunas as its columns. Early Roman coins were bilingual with Latin inscriptions on one side stating the name of the emperor and the town and with Punic text on the other side simply stating the name of the town.

Notes

References

Citations

Bibliography
 .

Further reading
 

Archaeological sites in Spain
Phoenician colonies in Spain
Former populated places in Spain